Chelsea was an American web television late-night talk show hosted by comedian Chelsea Handler. The show debuted on May 11, 2016 and streamed Wednesday, Thursday, and Friday each week worldwide on Netflix. The series concluded at 120 episodes as of December 15, 2017, as Handler stated that the show would end at the end of 2017.

Series overview

Episodes

Season 1 (2016)

Season 2 (2017)

References

External links 

Chelsea